Viola Lillian Myers (later Richardson, 1927 – November 15, 1993) was a Canadian sprinter who competed at the 1948 Summer Olympics. She won a bronze medal in the 4×100 m relay and finished fourth in the individual 100 m. Myers started training in athletics in the early 1940s, and in 1944 set a national record in the 80 m sprint. She set another national record in 1948, in the 60 m, which stood until 1973. Myers retired shortly after the 1950 British Empire Games. In 2011, she was inducted into the Athletics Ontario Hall of Fame. Canadian ice hockey players Doug and Murray Wilson are her nephews. She died in 1993 at a hospital in Toronto.

References

1927 births
1993 deaths
Athletes from Toronto
Canadian female sprinters
Olympic bronze medalists for Canada
Athletes (track and field) at the 1948 Summer Olympics
Olympic track and field athletes of Canada
Medalists at the 1948 Summer Olympics
Olympic bronze medalists in athletics (track and field)
Athletes (track and field) at the 1950 British Empire Games
Commonwealth Games competitors for Canada
Olympic female sprinters